Great Witchingham is a village and civil parish in the English county of Norfolk about  north-west of Norwich.

For the purposes of local government, it falls within the district of Broadland. 
Great Witchingham parish contains the hamlet of Lenwade.

The parish church of St Mary is a Grade I listed building dating from the 14th century.

The Norfolk Wildlife Centre and Country Park, a local attraction also known as the Animal Ark, is in Fakenham Road.

Old Witchingham Hall, built in the 16th century, was demolished in the 1980s. It was once the home of John Norris (1734–77), High Sheriff of Norfolk for 1766.

The village is also home to Great Witchingham Cricket Club, who play in the East Anglian Premier League.

Great Witchingham Hall

Great Witchingham Hall is a Grade II* listed country house built in the 16th or 17th century but extensively remodelled in the 19th century. It is built in two and three storeys of red brick with stone and plastered brick dressings and a steeply pitched slate roof. The Hall was owned and occupied by country squire Oliver Le Neve between 1678 and 1711. Le Neve is significant for his 1698 mortal duel with Sir Henry Hobart of Blickling Hall, the last duel fought in Norfolk.
The south wing was added in 1812 by Timothy Tompson and the north frontage redesigned in 1872 for Charles Kett Tompson, High Sheriff of Norfolk for 1827. After the latter's death it passed to his son-in-law, Viscount Canterbury. It later became the seat of William James Barry J.P. (1864–1952), High Sheriff of Norfolk for 1912, and his son Lieutenant-Colonel Gerald Barry (1896–1977). The dilapidated post-WW2 property was bought in 1950 by Bernard Matthews, and after being initially used for turkey rearing and processing, became the head office of his turkey business, Bernard Matthews Farms.

The GWR 6959 Modified Hall Class No.6966 was named Witchingham Hall. Out shopped from Swindon Works on 31 May 1944 as part of Lot No.350, she was initially allocated to 82D Westbury, and finally to 81F Oxford. Withdrawn on 30 September 1964, she was sold by British Railways to Birds scrap metal merchants of Risca, Newport, South Wales and disposed of on 28 February 1965.

Notes

External links

 gwvh.org.uk - Great Witchingham Village Hall Project
 GWPC - Great Witchingham Parish Council Website
 Gt Witchingham (Eades) watermill 

 
Villages in Norfolk
Civil parishes in Norfolk
Broadland